On February 14, 2018, 19-year-old Nikolas Cruz opened fire on students and staff at Marjory Stoneman Douglas High School in the Miami suburban town of Parkland, Florida, murdering 17 people and injuring 17 others. Cruz, a former student at the school, fled the scene on foot by blending in with other students, and was arrested without incident approximately one hour later in nearby Coral Springs. Police and prosecutors investigated "a pattern of disciplinary issues and unnerving behavior".

The killing spree is the deadliest high school shooting in United States history, surpassing the Columbine High School massacre that killed 15, including the perpetrators, in Colorado in April 1999. The shooting came at a period of heightened public support for gun control that followed mass shootings in Paradise, Nevada, and in Sutherland Springs, Texas, in October and November 2017.

Students at Parkland founded Never Again MSD, an advocacy group that lobbies for gun control. On , Governor Rick Scott signed a bill that implemented new restrictions to Florida's gun laws and also allowed for the arming of teachers who were properly trained and the hiring of school resource officers.

The Broward County Sheriff's Office received widespread criticism for its handling of the police response, both for not following up on multiple warnings about Cruz despite a lengthy record of threatening behavior and for staying outside the school instead of immediately confronting him. This led to the resignations of several police officers who responded to the scene, and the removal of Sheriff Scott Israel. A commission appointed by then-Governor Scott to investigate the shooting condemned the police inaction and urged school districts across the state to adopt greater measures of security.

On October 20, 2021, Cruz pleaded guilty to all charges and apologized for his crimes. The prosecution sought the death penalty, and a four-month death penalty trial was expected to commence in January 2022. After suffering numerous delays, in part due to the COVID-19 pandemic, the trial commenced on July 18, 2022. On October 13, 2022, a jury unanimously agreed that Cruz was eligible for the death penalty, but deadlocked on whether it should be imposed, resulting in a recommendation to sentence him to life imprisonment without the possibility of parole. On November 2, 2022, Cruz was sentenced to life without parole, in accordance with a Florida law requiring the court not to depart from the jury's recommendation.

Shooting 

The shooter, Nikolas Cruz, was dropped off at the school by an Uber driver at 2:19 p.m., 20 minutes before dismissal time. According to a police report, Cruz was carrying a rifle case and a backpack. He was spotted and recognized by a staff member who radioed a colleague that he was walking "purposefully" toward Building 12. However, he did not pursue the shooter or call a "Code Red" to lock down the school. The first staff member later claimed that his training called for only reporting threats; his colleague hid in a closet.

Cruz entered Building 12, a three-story structure containing 30 classrooms typically occupied by about 900 students and 30 teachers. Armed with an AR-15-style semi-automatic rifle and multiple magazines, Cruz entered a hallway and began firing indiscriminately at students and teachers. A fire alarm went off (either pulled by Cruz or activated by smoke from the gunfire), causing confusion because there had been a fire drill earlier in the day. Cruz first killed three students in the hallway, then fired through the windows of four closed classroom doors, killing six more students and wounding thirteen others. Students were unable to seek shelter at "hard corners"—areas of a classroom that people could safely hide at if a gunman peered through the window of a door—because many of the classrooms in Building 12 lacked one, and furniture otherwise obstructed potential safe spaces. Two of those killed were students in Ivy Schamis' Holocaust History class; Schamis was teaching a class lesson on combating hate when Cruz fired shots into her classroom. Around five students from Schamis' class were injured. According to Schamis, Cruz was unaware he was shooting into a class on the Holocaust, even though he had scrawled swastikas onto the ammunition magazines that he left at the school.

As the shooting unfolded, a "Code Red" was still not called due to confusion among school employees over who had the authority to do so. At about 2:21 p.m., a staff member eventually activated a lockdown, but only after discovering the body of a victim and hearing gunfire. An armed school resource officer of the Broward County Sheriff's Office was on campus when the shooting broke out, and he remained outside between Building 12 and the adjacent Building 7.

After killing two staff members near a stairwell, Cruz went to the second floor, where he fired into two more classrooms but did not hit anyone. On the third floor, he shot and killed five students and another staff member, who all had been stranded in the hallway; four other students were injured. Next, he went into a teachers' lounge where he attempted to shoot out the hurricane-resistant windows facing the yard in order to target students and staff fleeing below, but failed.

After he stopped shooting (possibly because his rifle jammed), Cruz dropped his rifle on the third floor of the building and left the scene by blending in with fleeing students. He then walked to a fast-food restaurant, stopping at a mall to get a soda on the way, and lingered before leaving on foot at 3:01 p.m.
At about 3:40 p.m., police stopped Cruz  from the school in the Wyndham Lakes neighborhood of Coral Springs and arrested him as the suspected shooter. He was then taken to a hospital emergency room with "labored breathing." After 40 minutes, Cruz was released back into police custody and booked into the Broward County Jail.

The shooting lasted for about six minutes in total, and all of the victims were shot within just under four minutes. School surveillance camera video showed Cruz as the shooter, and he was also recognized by eyewitnesses. While SWAT paramedics were inside the building, additional paramedics from the local Fire-Rescue department repeatedly requested to enter the building. These requests were denied by the Broward Sheriff's Office, even after the suspect was arrested.

Victims 

Seventeen people were killed, and seventeen more were wounded but survived. Three remained in critical condition the day after the shooting, and one remained by the second day.

Fatalities 
Twelve victims died inside the building, three died just outside the building on school premises, and two died in the hospital.

The fourteen students and three staff members killed were:

 Alyssa Alhadeff, 14
 Scott Beigel, 35
 Martin Duque, 14
 Nicholas Dworet, 17
 Aaron Feis, 37
 Jaime Guttenberg, 14
 Chris Hixon, 49
 Luke Hoyer, 15
 Cara Loughran, 14
 Gina Montalto, 14
 Joaquin Oliver, 17
 Alaina Petty, 14
 Meadow Pollack, 18
 Helena Ramsay, 17
 Alex Schachter, 14
 Carmen Schentrup, 16
 Peter Wang, 15

Geography teacher Scott Beigel was killed after he unlocked a classroom for students to enter and hide from Cruz. Aaron Feis, an assistant football coach and security guard, was killed as he shielded two students. Chris Hixon, the school's athletic director, was killed as he ran toward the sound of the gunfire and tried to help fleeing students.

Student Peter Wang was last seen in his Junior Reserve Officers' Training Corps (JROTC) uniform, holding doors open so others could get out more quickly; Wang was unable to flee with the students when Cruz appeared and fatally shot him. Commentators commended his actions and described him as a hero. A White House petition was circulated, calling for him to be buried with full military honors. At their respective funerals, Wang, Alaina Petty, and Martin Duque were all posthumously honored by the U.S. Army with the ROTC Medal for Heroism, and Wang was buried in his JROTC Blues uniform. On , he was given a rare posthumous admission to the United States Military Academy.

Alyssa Alhadeff was the captain of the Parkland Soccer Club. On , 2018—nearly three weeks after the shooting—she was honored by the United States women's national soccer team prior to a game in Orlando. Her teammates and family were invited to the game and presented with official jerseys that featured her name.

Meadow Pollack was a senior who was shot four times. As Cruz fired into other classrooms, Pollack crawled to a classroom door but was unable to get inside. Cara Loughran, a freshman, was alongside Pollack, and Pollack covered Loughran in an attempt to shield her from the bullets. The shooter returned to the classroom and located Pollack and Loughran, discharging his weapon five more times and killing both girls.

Injuries and survivors 

Dubbed "the real Iron Man", Borges was shot five times after he used his body to barricade the door of a classroom where twenty students were inside. Upon his release, Borges issued a statement that criticized the actions of Broward Sheriff's deputies, Sheriff Scott Israel, and School Superintendent Robert Runcie. His family has filed notice of its intent to sue the school district for personal injury to cover costs related to his recovery. Borges was honored with a humanitarian award at the 2018 BET Awards.

Survivors of the shooting, teachers and students alike, have struggled with survivor's guilt and other symptoms of post-traumatic stress disorder (PTSD). On March 17, 2019, thirteen months after the shooting, 19-year-old Sydney Aiello, who survived and whose friend Meadow Pollack had been killed during the shooting, died by suicide after struggling to attend college. She was terrified of being in a classroom and also had been treated for survivor's guilt and PTSD.  Less than a week later, a 16-year-old boy who had survived the shooting died by suicide.

Teacher Ivy Schamis was presented with USC Shoah Foundation's inaugural Stronger Than Hate Educator Award in 2019.  During her acceptance speech at the award ceremony, Schamis honored victims Nicholas Dworet and Helena Ramsay, who died in her class during the shooting.

Perpetrator 
Nikolas Jacob Cruz was born on September 24, 1998, in Margate, Florida, and was adopted at birth by Lynda and Roger Cruz. Both his adoptive parents died, Roger at age 67 on August 11, 2004, and Lynda at age 68 on November 1, 2017, leaving Cruz orphaned three months before the shooting. Since his mother's death, he had been living with relatives and friends. At the time of the shooting, he was enrolled in a GED program and employed at a local Dollar Tree.

Cruz was a member of the Junior Reserve Officers' Training Corps and had received multiple awards "including academic achievement for maintaining an A grade in JROTC and Bs in other subjects," according to CNN. He was also a member of his school's varsity air rifle team.

Behavioral issues and social media 
Cruz had behavioral issues since preschool, and according to The Washington Post he was "entrenched in the process for getting students help rather than referring them to law enforcement." He was transferred between schools six times in three years in an effort to deal with these problems. In 2014, he was transferred to a school for children with emotional or learning disabilities. There were reports that he made threats against other students.

He returned to Stoneman Douglas High School two years later but was expelled in 2017 for disciplinary reasons. As he could not be expelled from the Broward County School system completely, he was transferred to alternative placement. The school administration had circulated an email to teachers, warning that Cruz had made threats against other students. The school banned him from wearing a backpack on campus.

Psychiatrists recommended an involuntary admission of Cruz to a residential treatment facility, starting in 2013. The Florida Department of Children and Families investigated him in September 2016 for Snapchat posts in which he cut both his arms and said he planned to buy a gun. At this time, a school resource officer suggested he undergo an involuntary psychiatric examination under the provisions of the Baker Act. Two guidance counselors agreed, but a mental institution did not. State investigators reported he had depression, autism, and attention deficit hyperactivity disorder (ADHD). In their assessment, they concluded he was "at low risk of harming himself or others". He had previously received mental health treatment, but had not received treatment in the year leading up to the shooting.

Broward County Sheriff Scott Israel described Cruz's online profiles and accounts as "very, very disturbing". They contained pictures and posts of him with a variety of weapons, including long knives, a shotgun, a pistol, and a BB gun. Police said that he held "extremist" views; social media accounts that were thought to be linked to him contained anti-black and anti-Muslim slurs. YouTube comments linked to him include "I wanna die Fighting killing shit ton of people," threats against police officers and "antifa", and intent to mimic the University of Texas tower shooting. One of Cruz's Instagram accounts had a profile photo of a person wearing a "Make America Great Again" baseball cap.

In February 2017, Cruz legally purchased an AR-15-style semi-automatic rifle from a Coral Springs gun store, after having passed the required background check. Prior to the purchase he had similarly obtained several other firearms, including at least one shotgun and several other rifles. At the time of the shooting, in Florida, it was legal for people as young as 18 to purchase guns from federally licensed dealers, including the rifle allegedly used in the shooting. The minimum age requirement has since been raised to 21.

Items recovered by police at the scene included gun magazines with swastikas carved in them. One student claimed that Cruz had drawn a swastika and the words "I hate niggers" on his backpack. CNN reported that Cruz was in a private Instagram group chat where he expressed racist, homophobic, antisemitic, and xenophobic views. Cruz said that he hated "Jews, n*ggers, immigrants" and frequently discussed the weapons that he owned. At one point Cruz said "I think I am going to kill people" in the group chat, although he later claimed that he was joking.

A former classmate said Cruz had anger management issues and often joked about guns and gun violence, which included threats of shooting up establishments. The brother of a 2016 graduate described him as "super stressed out all the time and talked about guns a lot and tried to hide his face." A student who was enrolled at the school at the time of the shooting said, "I think everyone had in their minds if anybody was going to do it, it was going to be him." A classmate who was assigned to work with him in sophomore year said, "He told me how he got kicked out of two private schools. He was held back twice. He had aspirations to join the military. He enjoyed hunting." A student's mother said that he also bragged about killing animals. A neighbor said his mother would call the police over to the house to try to talk some sense into him.

Earlier warnings to law enforcement 
Sheriff Scott Israel said that his office received 23 calls about Cruz during the previous decade, but this figure is in dispute. CNN used a public records request to obtain a sheriff's office log, which showed that from 2008 to 2017, at least 45 calls were made in reference to Cruz, his brother, or the family home. On , 2016, a peer counselor notified the school resource officer of his suicide attempt and intent to buy a gun, and the school indicated it would do a "threat assessment".

In September 2016, three people—a sheriff's deputy who worked as a resource officer at Stoneman Douglas, and two of the school's counselors—stated that Cruz should be committed for mental evaluation.

On , 2017, a person with the username "nikolas cruz" posted a comment to a YouTube video that read, "Im  going to be a professional school shooter." The person who uploaded the video to YouTube reported the comment to the FBI. According to agent Robert Lasky, the agency conducted database reviews but was unable to track down the individual who made the threatening comment.

On , 2018, less than two months before the shooting, the FBI received a tip on its Public Access Line from a person who was close to Cruz. On , two days after the shooting, the agency released a statement that detailed this information. According to the statement, "The caller provided information about Cruz's gun ownership, desire to kill people, erratic behavior, and disturbing social media posts, as well as the potential of him conducting a school shooting." After conducting an investigation, the FBI said the tip line did not follow protocol when the information was not forwarded to the Miami Field Office, where investigative steps would have been taken. The FBI opened a probe into the tip line's operations.

The lack of response by Israel and other members of the Broward County Sheriff's Office to the numerous red flags and warnings about Cruz has been the subject of scrutiny. In the days following the shooting, calls for Israel’s resignation intensified as more information that alluded to the department's inaction was revealed. Israel refused to resign in the immediate aftermath of the shooting, saying during an interview with CNN, "I've given amazing leadership to this agency" while denying responsibility for the actions of his deputies. This culminated in Governor Ron DeSantis removing Israel from his role as Sheriff and replacing him with Gregory Tony.

Efforts to seek help 
The school district conducted an assessment of the handling of Cruz. According to their redacted report, which was reviewed in August 2018 by The New York Times, The Daily Beast, and other media, a year before the shooting Cruz had sought help from education specialists, as his grades at Stoneman Douglas were declining. He was an eighteen-year-old junior, and met with the specialists with his mother. The specialists recommended that he transfer to another school, Cross Creek School in Pompano Beach, where he had done well before. But he wanted to graduate with his class at Stoneman Douglas, and rejected this option, as a legal adult. He was advised that if he stayed, he would no longer be able to access special education services, but this was incorrect. A few months later, he withdrew because of failing grades. After that, Cruz requested to go to Cross Creek, but he was told a new assessment was needed, delaying action, and the request was denied.

Legal proceedings

Criminal case 
At his initial arraignment the day after the shootings, Cruz was charged with 17 counts of premeditated murder and held without bond. According to an affidavit by the sheriff's office, Cruz confessed to the shooting. It was also claimed Cruz told officers that he brought additional loaded magazines hidden in a backpack.

Cruz was placed on suicide watch in an isolation cell (solitary confinement) after the arraignment. Lead defense counsel Gordon Weekes asked Broward Circuit Judge Elizabeth Scherer to recuse herself, claiming that her previous comments and rulings showed favoritism toward the prosecution, which would prevent Cruz from receiving a fair trial.

2018 
On , a grand jury indicted Cruz on 34 charges: 17 counts of first-degree murder and 17 counts of attempted first-degree murder. They said they could prove five of the aggravating factors that qualify a murder for the death penalty in Florida. Cruz declined to enter a plea, so Scherer entered "not guilty" on his behalf. The defense had earlier offered a guilty plea if the death penalty were taken off the table, and reiterated it immediately before it was refused.

During the week of April 8–12, 2018, Scherer included a three-page letter from a Minnesotan into the court record of the case. The letter was addressed to the judge and claimed that research into Cruz's past led the writer to believe that Cruz had a developmental disability and that he was "fearful of other people and was threatened by bullies." The letter ended by claiming that Cruz appeared to be consumed by sadness and depression.

The same week, a hearing was held to determine if Cruz was entitled to a public defender. His attorney, court-appointed public defender Howard Finkelstein, asked the court to wait until the probate case involving Cruz's late mother's estate was concluded and Cruz's net worth could be determined, as Cruz would have only been entitled to a public defender had he been unable to afford a private attorney.

According to the Broward County Sheriff's Office, Cruz attacked a jail officer on the night of November 13, 2018. The following day, he was charged with aggravated assault on an officer, battery against an officer, and use of an "electric or chemical weapon against an officer." The officer who was allegedly attacked by Cruz had asked him to "not drag his sandals on the ground" while he was walking in the jail's dayroom. It was claimed Cruz responded by "displaying his middle finger" and striking the officer in the face. He also grabbed the stun gun out of the deputy's holster. The weapon discharged during the brawl before the deputy regained control and Cruz was placed in solitary confinement. Cruz appeared at an initial hearing on the assault charges, where bail was set at $200,000.

2019 
On April 24, 2019, a determination was made that Cruz and his half-brother Zachary would share the proceeds of a MetLife insurance policy valued at $864,929. This would make Cruz ineligible for representation by the public defender's office, and the office therefore asked to be removed from his case on that date.

Scherer ruled on July 26 that Cruz's confession would be released to the public, adding on August 3 that the Broward school district's report on Cruz would also be released, with some redactions to protect Cruz's privacy rights. The confession was released on August 6. On August 8, a video of Cruz's confession filmed by the Broward County Sheriff's Office was published by TMZ. Cruz can be heard crying near the end of the video, and saying "kill me" to the camera.

2020 
Cruz's trial, initially scheduled to begin on January 27, 2020, was originally delayed until mid-year to allow his lawyers more time to build their case. The case was then delayed again due to the COVID-19 pandemic; the case was expected to go to trial in September 2021. However, a start date for the trial was not set.

2021 
Prior to trial, the judge, Elizabeth Scherer, ruled that the use of "derogatory words" to refer to Cruz would not be allowed from prosecutors or witnesses during the trial, saying that it would not be feasible to create an "exhaustive list of words" that should not be used to describe Cruz. However, Judge Scherer also ruled against the defense in the use of some words, ruling that Cruz can be called "killer", "school shooter" or "murderer" as she deemed those words "normal to describe particular facts."

On October 14, a trial was scheduled for the following day, where it was reported that Cruz would plead guilty to the battery charge. Judge Scherer stated she would hold a hearing on October 20, where Cruz planned to plead guilty to all counts relating to the shooting to avoid the death penalty.

On October 20, Cruz pleaded guilty to all charges, including murder and attempted murder. Cruz made a statement after pleading guilty in which he expressed regret for his crimes and asked the victims' families to decide his fate.

Cruz was also sentenced that day for his attack on Sgt. Beltran. He was given 26 years in prison for the assault charge.

2022 
Cruz's death penalty trial began July 18, 2022 and was presided over by Circuit Judge Elizabeth Scherer. On July 27, 2022, prosecutors presented the jurors digital evidence in their investigation. Jurors were presented with a 18-page list of search queries from various Google accounts. The list included searches such as "how to become a school shooter", "Why I want to kill woman", and "pumped up kicks columbine high school" (a reference to the song "Pumped Up Kicks"). On August 4, 2022, the prosecution rested its case. On August 20, 2022, newspaper the Sun Sentinel released drawings written by Cruz in prison which he created in May. In the drawings, he blamed his ex-girlfriend's new boyfriend for making him do the shooting, who Cruz claimed sexually humiliated him on Instagram prior to the attack.

The defense presented the jurors evidence and testimony that Cruz suffered from brain damage, mental illness and disabilities resulting from his birth mother drinking alcohol and using various illegal drugs during her pregnancy with him and failure by the state and the school and other sources to get him proper treatment. In a rebuttal, an expert witness for the prosecution testified that Cruz faked his mental condition in a psychiatric evaluation and diagnosed him with both antisocial and borderline personality disorders.

The defense team for Cruz rested their case on September 14, 2022. The prosecution's rebuttal began on September 27, 2022, and ended on September 29, 2022. Closing arguments were delivered on October 11, 2022.

On October 13, 2022, the jury recommended that Cruz be sentenced to life imprisonment without the possibility of parole. While the jury found that the state had proven beyond a reasonable doubt the aggravating factors on all counts, they were not unanimous on whether the aggravating factors outweighed the mitigating factors.

Nearly all of the murdered victims' families expressed anger and extreme disappointment toward the verdict, stating in their victim impact statements that he deserved the death penalty. Other points of contention from the victims were the improper conduct of Cruz's lawyers during the trial as well as the unanimity required by Florida law to impose the death penalty as opposed to a majority vote. Florida governor Ron DeSantis, who also criticized the jury's recommendation to spare Cruz the death penalty, has called for changes to the law.

On November 2, 2022, Cruz was officially sentenced to 34 consecutive life sentences without the possibility of parole, one each for the total number of victims murdered and wounded by Cruz.

Civil lawsuits 
On May 23, 2018, the parents of victims Jaime Guttenberg and Alex Schachter sued firearm manufacturer American Outdoor Brands Corporation, formerly known as Smith & Wesson, the manufacturer of the rifle used by Cruz, and distributor Sunrise Tactical Supply, the retailer who sold Cruz the rifle, claiming damages due to "the defendant's complicity in the entirely foreseeable, deadly use of the assault-style weapons that they place on the market."

Fifteen survivors sued the county, sheriff and school officials for failing to protect them, contending that the government's inadequate response to the shooting violated their Fourteenth Amendment right to due process. This lawsuit was dismissed in December 2018, with the judge citing prior case law in ruling that the government did not have a duty to protect the defendants from the actions of the shooter.

In 2021, the families of the victims of the shooting were awarded a $25 million settlement from Broward County School District, after a civil lawsuit was filed by the families of the 52 victims alleging the school district's negligence was to blame. The money will be paid in three installments and settles 52 of the 53 lawsuits filed against the school district for negligence, although the specified amounts for each family were not released. Later in the year it was announced that the families of the victims had reached a $125 to $130 million settlement with the federal government, due to the FBI's inactivity about tips on Cruz's stated desire to commit a school attack and the weapons cache that he had. The tip had been through the FBI tip line a month prior to the shooting and detailed Cruz's gun ownership, desire to kill others, erratic behavior, and social media posts, and was not followed up on by investigators.

Aftermath 
On May 30, 2018, prosecutors released three videos that they claimed Cruz had recorded on his cellphone before the shooting. In the videos, Cruz appears to describe his personal feelings, his enthusiasm and plan for the shooting, his hatred of people, and how it would make him notorious.

School response 
The school district provided grief counseling to students and their families. Florida Attorney General Pam Bondi said that funeral and counseling fees would be paid for by the state.

On , police presence was increased at schools in at least two counties in Florida in response to the shooting.

On , Broward Schools Superintendent Robert Runcie announced that the building where the shooting took place would be demolished. On October 9, 2020, a replacement building was opened. The building where the shooting took place will not be demolished until the trial of Cruz is over, as it has been declared a crime scene.

On , two weeks after the shooting, Stoneman Douglas reopened to students amid a heavy police presence. School principal Ty Thompson emphasized that the first week back would be focused on healing, with classes ending at 11:40 a.m. through . He tweeted "Remember our focus is on emotional readiness and comfort not curriculum: so there is no need for backpacks. Come ready to start the healing process and #RECLAIMTHENEST." Extra counseling and emotional support dogs were provided to students upon their return.

In early April, the school implemented several new safety rules and regulations. The changes included fewer entrances, law enforcement officers at each entrance, identification badges for students and staff, and the requirement that all book bags must be clear plastic. The use of metal detectors was under consideration. Several students criticized the new safety measures as ineffective and intrusive.

On November 30, 2018, the Sun-Sentinel reported that Broward County Public Schools, which runs Marjory Stoneman Douglas High School, had spent about $185,000 attempting to obscure its role in not preventing the massacre. The district also spent an undisclosed sum on legal opposition to the releasing of records related to the school's treatment of Nikolas Cruz while he was a student, and the school security procedures. A company named CEN received a $60,000 payment to review Cruz's school records and to investigate if the Broward County Public Schools followed the law in its handling of Cruz as a troubled student. The final report omitted various details about the instability of Cruz.

Graduation ceremony 
The school held its graduation ceremony on June 3, 2018, and diplomas were presented to the families of Nicholas Dworet, Joaquin Oliver, Meadow Pollack, and Carmen Schentrup, four seniors who were killed in the attack. Stoneman Douglas principal Ty Thompson began by dedicating the ceremony to "those not with us". Many graduates wore sashes that were emblazoned with #MSDStrong, or decorated their caps with references to the Never Again movement, while some dedicated their caps to their late classmates. Families of the victims also made statements; the mother of Joaquin Oliver accepted his diploma wearing a shirt saying "This should be my son." Talk show host Jimmy Fallon made a surprise appearance and gave a commencement speech to the graduating class, thanking them for their courage and bravery.

First anniversary 
On the first anniversary of the incident, the school opted to establish a voluntary attendance day, organizing a day of community service with early dismissal so that the school was closed at the time of the attack. A police line was created to shelter those students who chose to attend. The large, planned project for the day was to replace the memorial with a permanent memorial garden. A planned moment of silence at 10:17 am ET was held, with support provided from grief counselors and therapy dogs. An interfaith memorial service was planned in a separate location.

Officer inactivity 
SRO Scot Peterson, who was armed, on-site and in uniform as a Broward Sheriff's Office deputy, was accused of remaining outside Building 12 during the shooting. Eight days after the attack, he was suspended without pay by Sheriff Israel, and he immediately retired. Sheriff Israel said "Scot Peterson was absolutely on campus for this entire event," and that he should have "gone in, addressed the killer, [and] killed the killer."

In June 2019, following an investigation that included interviews with 184 witnesses, Peterson was arrested and then bonded out for the crime of failing to protect the students during the shooting. He faces 11 charges of neglect of a child, as well as culpable negligence and perjury. Peterson pleaded not guilty and has filed a motion to have all charges dropped.

A statement released by Peterson's lawyer before he was charged said that Peterson believed the shooting was happening outside the building. According to the lawyer, Peterson claimed he told this to the first Coral Springs police officer who arrived on scene. The statement also pointed to radio transmissions that indicated a gunshot victim near the football field.

The Miami Herald transcribed radio dispatches that Peterson said at 2:23 during the shooting, "Be advised we have possible, could be firecrackers. I think we have shots fired, possible shots fired—1200 building." Seconds later, Peterson radioed: "We're talking about the 1200 building it's going to be the building off Holmberg Road Get the school locked down, gentlemen!" At 2:25, he radioed that "We also heard it's by, inside the 1200." At an unspecified time, Peterson called for police to ensure that "no one comes inside the school." At 2:27, at Building 12, he radioed, "Stay at least 500 feet away at this point." At an unspecified time, Peterson ordered: "Do not approach the 12 or 1300 building, stay at least 500 feet away."

On , the sheriff's office released video footage in compliance with a court order. The video was captured by school surveillance cameras and showed some of Peterson's movements during the shooting.

Unnamed sources told CNN that Coral Springs police arrived at the scene and saw three Broward deputies behind their vehicles with pistols drawn. Broward Sheriff's Office captain Jan Jordan ordered deputies to form a perimeter instead of immediately confronting the shooter; this tactic was contrary to their training regarding active shooters. Based on time stamps of the police logs, the order was given some time after the shooting had stopped. Jordan was widely criticized for her actions, and she resigned, citing personal reasons, nine months after the shooting.

Sheriff Israel said that Coral Springs officers were the first to enter the building, about four minutes after Cruz had surreptitiously left the school. Due to a tape delay in viewing surveillance footage, officers believed that Cruz was still in the building.  there were three investigations into the timeline of police response.

President Trump criticized the officers who failed to enter the building during the shooting. On , he said that he would have entered "even if I didn't have a weapon, and I think most of the people in this room would have done that, too."

Reactions

Political reaction 

President Trump offered his prayers and condolences to the victims' families, writing, "no child, teacher or anyone else should ever feel unsafe in an American school." In a televised address, he mentioned school safety and mental health issues. Florida Governor Rick Scott ordered that flags at state buildings be flown at half-staff. Two days after the shooting, Trump and the first lady Melania visited Broward Health North, a hospital where eight of the shooting victims were admitted. They met with two victims and Trump praised doctors and law enforcement officials for their responses to the attack.

On , Trump met with students and others for a "listening session" at the White House. He suggested arming up to 20% of the teachers to stop "maniacs" from attacking students. The following day, he called a "gun free" school a "magnet" for criminals and tweeted, "Highly trained, gun adept, teachers/coaches would solve the problem instantly, before police arrive."

BBC News characterized Republican politicians' reactions as focusing on mental health issues while dodging debate on gun control, with the reasoning that it was either "too political or too soon." Republican House Speaker Paul Ryan said that this was the time to "step back and count our blessings" instead of "taking sides and fighting each other politically." Republican Florida Senator Marco Rubio said that "most" proposals on stricter gun laws "would not have prevented" this shooting nor "any of those in recent history" and that lawmakers should take action with "focus on the violence part" alongside guns. Republican Kentucky Governor Matt Bevin declared that the country should re-evaluate "the things being put in the hands of our young people," specifically "quote-unquote video games" that "have desensitized people to the value of human life." Republican Senator Pat Roberts of Kansas said he supported age restrictions on the ownership of AR-15-style rifles, saying "Certainly nobody under 21 should have an AR-15." Republican Senator from Oklahoma James Lankford said on NBC News' Meet the Press he was open to requiring more comprehensive background checks for firearm purchases, saying "The problem is not owning an AR-15, it's the person who owns it." Republican governor of Ohio John Kasich called for restrictions on the sales of AR-15-style rifles, saying on CNN "if all of a sudden, you couldn't buy an AR-15, what would you lose? Would you feel as though your Second Amendment rights would be eroded because you couldn't buy a God-darn AR-15?" Republican Representative Brian Mast from Florida, a former resident of Parkland and an Army veteran, wrote in an op-ed in The New York Times that he supported a ban on the sale of civilian versions of military rifles, writing:

Most nights in Afghanistan, I wielded an M4 carbine. My rifle was very similar to the AR-15-style semiautomatic weapon used to kill students, teachers and a coach I knew at Marjory Stoneman Douglas High School in Parkland, Fla., where I once lived...I cannot support the primary weapon I used to defend our people being used to kill children I swore to defend. The AR-15 is an excellent platform for recreational shooters to learn to be outstanding marksmen. Unfortunately, it is also an excellent platform for those who wish to kill the innocent.

Democratic Senator from Florida Bill Nelson said "I have hunted all my life. But an AR-15 is not for hunting. It's for killing."

Al Hoffman Jr., a Republican donor in Florida, pledged that he would no longer fund legislative groups or candidates who were not actively working to ban sales of military-style weapons to civilians. He said, "For how many years now have we been doing this—having these experiences of terrorism, mass killings—and how many years has it been that nothing's been done?"

Sheriff Israel called on lawmakers to amend the Baker Act to allow police to detain and hospitalize people who make disturbing posts—not just clear threats—on social media. "I'm talking about being around bombs, possibly talking about 'I want to be a serial killer,' talking about taking people's lives," he said. "Just taking a picture with a gun or a knife or a weapon—that in and of itself is clearly not even remotely something that we're concerned about."

Gun control debate 

Many student survivors criticized the response from politicians and asked them not to offer condolences but to take action to prevent more students from being killed in school shootings. These students have demanded stricter gun control measures. Survivor X González was noted for their speech that rebuked thoughts and prayers from politicians. They later helped lead a protest movement against gun violence in the United States. Broward County Schools Superintendent Robert Runcie said, "now is the time to have a real conversation about gun control legislation." Lori Alhadeff, whose daughter was killed in the shooting, implored Trump to do something to improve school safety.

In the aftermath of the shooting, some of the student survivors organized Never Again MSD. The group was created on social media with the hashtag #NeverAgain, activism inspired in part by the ground broken by the #MeToo movement and the 2018 Women's March. The group demanded legislative action to prevent similar shootings, and has condemned lawmakers who received political contributions from the National Rifle Association.

Since the shooting, several more rallies have been planned to take place with the focus on legislative action. A series of demonstrations called "March for Our Lives" on  included a march in Washington, D.C. On , the anniversary of the Columbine High School massacre, all-day walkouts were planned for teacher groups by educators Diane Ravitch and David Berliner, as well as student groups.

On , dozens of Stoneman Douglas High School students went to the state Capitol in Tallahassee and watched as the Florida House of Representatives rejected a bill that would have banned some guns characterized as assault weapons. Students strongly criticized the vote. The bill's sponsor, Carlos Guillermo Smith, highlighted the legislature's failure to respond to the use of an assault weapon in the mass shooting at Stoneman Douglas High School, while passing a bill to declare that pornography is a public health risk.

In mid-March, Lori Alhadeff announced her own nonprofit organization, Make Schools Safe, which will be mostly focusing on school campus security.

In May 2018, Cameron Kasky's father registered a super PAC, Families vs Assault Rifles PAC (FAMSVARPAC), with intentions of going "up against NRA candidates in every meaningful race in the country."

State law 

In March 2018, the Florida Legislature passed a bill titled the Marjory Stoneman Douglas High School Public Safety Act. It raised the minimum age for buying rifles to 21, established waiting periods and background checks, provided a program for the arming of some school employees and hiring of school police, banned bump stocks, and barred some potentially violent or mentally unhealthy people arrested under certain laws from possessing guns.

On the day the Parkland bill was signed into law, the NRA sued, challenging the ban on gun sales to people ages 18 to 21. The U.S. District Court for the Northern District of Florida upheld the constitutionality of the law and dismissed the NRA's suit in June 2021.

Federal law 

On February 20, 2018, Trump directed the Department of Justice to issue regulations to ban bump stocks.

On , the STOP School Violence Act was signed into law as part of the Consolidated Appropriations Act, 2018, which increases funding for metal detectors, security training, and similar safety measures. Lawmakers made it clear it was in response to the shooting and the public outcry. Some students from the Stoneman Douglas High School, who were active in calling for stricter gun control (not just safety measures), said the measure was passed because lawmakers "pass something very easy and simple that everyone can get behind. But that's because it doesn't do anything."

Boycott of NRA and responses from businesses 

Following the shooting, people boycotted gun rights advocacy groups including the National Rifle Association of America (NRA) and its business affiliates. Many companies responded to the shooting by changing some of their business dealings and practices.

Calls for companies to sever their ties to the NRA were heeded when several companies terminated their business relationships with the NRA.

Major gun sellers such as Dick's, Walmart, and Fred Meyer voluntarily raised the age requirement on gun purchases from 18 to 21. The NRA challenged the new age requirement in court.  Other businesses like Bank of America and Citibank also ended some of their dealings with gun manufacturers and vendors.

Victims' funds 
Two other funds, Florida's Crime Victims Compensation Fund, which pays for medical and funeral expenses, and the National Compassion Fund, which pays for pain and suffering, are also available to help the victims of the Parkland shooting.

In addition, victim Scott Beigel's family started a memorial fund in his name with the goal of funding summer camp tuition for students traumatized by school shootings, a passion of Beigel. The memorial fund is majorly involved with events, including a 5K run, and partnered with Oneida-based Camp Fiver, which also gave the fund an honorary award.

Conspiracy theories, disinformation, and harassment 

Anti-gun control conspiracy theories circulated in the wake of the shooting. The speculation included false claims that the shooting did not happen or was staged by "crisis actors". One such claim was made by Benjamin A. Kelly, a district secretary for Republican State Representative Shawn Harrison, who sent an email to the Tampa Bay Times falsely stating that the children in the picture were not students at the school. As a result of the backlash, Kelly was fired hours later. Former Republican congressman and CNN contributor Jack Kingston suggested student demonstrators were paid by billionaire George Soros or were supported by "members of Antifa". A video with a description espousing a conspiracy theory that student David Hogg was a "crisis actor" reached the top of YouTube's trending page before it was removed by the company. As the shooting took place, a teacher directed Hogg and several other students to hide in a closet. Hogg, who worked on the school's TV station, then filmed student reactions to the shooting in an effort to document the event.

The Alliance for Securing Democracy alleged that Russia-linked accounts on Twitter and other platforms used the shooting's aftermath to inflame tensions and divide Americans by posting loaded comments that oppose gun control. Other Russia-linked accounts labeled the shooting a false flag operation that the U.S. government would exploit to seize guns from citizens. Hundreds of Russian bots were also suspected of coming to the defense of Laura Ingraham on Twitter following the boycott of her show, The Ingraham Angle, that resulted from her public ridicule of Hogg. The conspiracy theories about survivors like Hogg and González were named PolitiFact's 2018 Lie of the Year.

Some of the survivors of the shooting and their relatives were targeted by online harassment that included death threats. Cameron Kasky wrote on Twitter that he was quitting Facebook for the time being, because the death threats from "NRA cultists" were slightly more graphic on a service without a character limit.

In March 2019, future Republican U.S. Representative Marjorie Taylor Greene for Georgia was filmed heckling and harassing survivor David Hogg as he was walking toward the United States Capitol.

See also 

 Assault weapons legislation in the United States
 Extreme Risk Protection Order
 Federal Assault Weapons Ban
 Gun politics in the United States
 List of attacks related to secondary schools
 List of disasters in the United States by death toll
 List of rampage killers (school massacres)
 List of school shootings in the United States
 2018 Santa Fe High School shooting  similar school shooting in Texas in May 2018
 Northern Illinois University shooting  school shooting that occurred on Valentine's Day, exactly 10 years earlier

Notes

References

External links 

 
  (2:11)
  (26:46)
  (27:45) 
 Draft report of the incident from the Marjory Stoneman Douglas High School Public Safety Commission

 
2018 in Florida
2018 in the United States
2018 mass shootings in the United States
2018 murders in the United States
21st-century mass murder in the United States
Articles containing video clips
Attacks in the United States in 2018
Attacks on buildings and structures in the United States
History of Broward County, Florida
Deaths by firearm in Florida
February 2018 crimes in the United States
February 2018 events in the United States
Filmed killings
Gun politics in the United States
High school killings in the United States
High school shootings in the United States
Mass murder in 2018
Mass murder in Florida
Mass murder in the United States
Mass shootings in Florida
Mass shootings in the United States
Massacres in 2018
Massacres in the United States
Presidency of Donald Trump
School massacres in the United States
School shootings committed by pupils
2018 active shooter incidents in the United States